is a Japanese voice actress who works for 81 Produce.

Notable filmography
 Dante in Romeo's Blue Skies (1995)
Rumiya in Magical Girl Pretty Sammy (1995)
Princess Fatora in El Hazard (1995)
Kenta in Brave Command Dagwon: The Boy With The Crystal Eyes (1996)
Martina Xoana Mel Navratilova in Slayers Next (1996)
Ryousuke Shiroyama, Kensuke Watanabe in You're Under Arrest (TV series) (1996)
Mimi in Buttobi CPU (1997)
Chisa Shinohara in Fancy Lala (1998)
Millienium Feria Nocturne in Lost Universe (1998)
Larry (young) in Silent Möbius (1998)
Sister Akane in St. Luminous Mission High School (1998)
Saeno Hiiragi in Seraphim Call (1999)
Kyoko-chan in Hamtaro (2000)
Eris Williamette in Gear Fighter Dendoh (2000)

Unknown date
Raichi in Mirmo!
Sho Aizawa in Figure 17
Tokuzo Sugiura in Chibi Maruko-chan
Dizzy in Bob the Builder
Kinako Monaka in Magical Nyan Nyan Taruto
Chisao Ohyama in Rockman.EXE series
Megumi Shinohara in Future GPX Cyber Formula SAGA
Emperor Rudolf Gerhard Zeppelin III in Zoids: Chaotic Century
Roan in Grandia II
Tsubasa in Matantei Loki Ragnarok (episoden: 3 und 13)
Kytes in Final Fantasy XII: Revenant Wings

External links
 
 
Tomoko Ishimura (listed as Kyoko Tsuruno) at Ryu's Seiyuu Infos

1972 births
Living people
81 Produce voice actors
Japanese voice actresses
Voice actresses from Kanagawa Prefecture
People from Zama, Kanagawa
20th-century Japanese actresses
21st-century Japanese actresses